Robert Eugene Somerville (born 1940 in Pittsburgh, Pennsylvania) was until his retirement the Ada Byron Bampton Tremaine Professor of Religion and Professor of History at Columbia University, New York. Since July 1, 2020, he has been the Tremaine Professor Emeritus of Religion. He has taught at Columbia since 1969, except for a year at the University of Pennsylvania (1976–1977).

Somerville did his doctoral work under Stephan Kuttner at Yale University. He has published widely on the high medieval history of the papacy and of canon law. He is internationally recognized as an authority on medieval church councils. With the publication of his 2011 book Pope Urban II's Council of Piacenza, he has published completely all the sources relating to the councils of Pope Urban II.

Somerville is a member of the American Academy of Arts and Sciences and a Fellow of the Medieval Academy of America and of the Commission internationale de diplomatique. He is a corresponding member of the Monumenta Germaniae Historica in Munich and of the Bavarian Academy of Sciences and Humanities. He has received numerous awards, including two John Simon Guggenheim Memorial Fellowships, in 1974 and 1987.

In 2012, the Catholic University of America Press published a Festschrift in his honor, Canon Law, Religion, and Politics: "Liber Amicorum" Robert Somerville, edited by his former students , Anders Winroth, and Peter Landau.

He currently lives on the Upper West Side in Manhattan, New York. His son, Gregory Somerville, graduated in 2013 from Columbia College with a Bachelor of Arts in music.

Books

References

External links
Somerville's Columbia University web page

1940 births
Living people
Writers from Pittsburgh
American medievalists
Yale University alumni
Columbia University faculty
Fellows of the Medieval Academy of America
Historians from Pennsylvania